Bimala Tamang (born 9 June 1995) is a (Nepalese) Nepali female karateka who recently won bronze for the Women's Individual Kata (in Karate) at the 2014 Asian Games in Incheon, South Korea. This was Nepal's first and only medal tallied at the 2014 Games.

Al-Ahli International Karate Open
During the 2012 Al-Ahli International karate Open in Dubai, UAE, Tamang landed herself several medals in the individual kata; joint bronze in female seniors A, gold in female U18 A, silver in Kata team female U18 A and Kumite team female U17 A.

References

External links
 
 YouTube: News report on Bimala Tamang

1995 births
Living people
Nepalese female karateka
Asian Games medalists in karate
Karateka at the 2014 Asian Games
People from Dhading District
Asian Games bronze medalists for Nepal

Medalists at the 2014 Asian Games
20th-century Nepalese women
21st-century Nepalese women